Jordan Taylor Mein (born October 10, 1989) is a  Canadian professional mixed martial artist who currently competes in the Welterweight division. A professional competitor since 2006, Mein has also formerly competed for Ultimate Fighting Championship, Bellator MMA, Strikeforce and King of the Cage.

Background
Mein's father, Lee Mein, began operating a local promotion called Rumble in the Cage. It gave Mein, who had been training since the age of four, his first fighting opportunity and when he was just 11 years old he fought another local boy in a kickboxing match. That fight helped start Mein's fighting career that has included kickboxing tournaments, Brazilian jiu-jitsu competitions, at both the amateur and professional level.

Mixed martial arts career

Early career
Jordan's first amateur fight came when he was 14, and he compiled a 6–0–1 record before turning professional. He turned professional at the age of 16 in June 2006 at one of his father's Rumble in the Cage shows.

Jordan defeated Joe Riggs via second round KO at Wreck MMA: Strong and Proud on January 28, 2011.

He fought UFC veteran Josh Burkman at MMA 1: The Reckoning on April 2, 2011. He won via unanimous decision.

Strikeforce
Mein signed a four-fight deal with Strikeforce in July 2011 and made his promotional debut at Strikeforce World Grand Prix: Barnett vs. Kharitonov, defeating Evangelista Santos via TKO in the third round.

Mein fought Tyron Woodley at Strikeforce: Rockhold vs. Jardine. He lost a split decision (28-29, 29-28, 30-27).

Mein defeated Tyler Stinson at Strikeforce: Rockhold vs. Kennedy via unanimous decision.

Score Fighting Series
Jordan fought Dream Welterweight Champion, Marius Žaromskis at Score Fighting Series 1 on June 10, 2011 Winning via unanimous decision.

Mein fought Forrest Petz in the main event of the Score Fighting Series 7 on November 23, 2012.  He won via TKO early in the first round.

Ultimate Fighting Championship
Mein made his UFC promotional against Dan Miller on March 16, 2013 at UFC 158. He won the fight via TKO in the first round.

Mein made a quick return to the Octagon as he faced Matt Brown on April 20, 2013 at UFC on Fox 7, replacing an injured Dan Hardy. He lost the fight via TKO in the second round, after a Brown knee fractured his nasal and orbital bones.  Despite the loss, the back-and-forth bout earned him his first Fight of the Night bonus award.

Mein was expected to face Santiago Ponzinibbio on April 19, 2014 at UFC on Fox 11.  However, Ponzinibbio was removed from the bout and was replaced by Hernani Perpetuo. He won the fight via split decision.

Mein was expected to face Thiago Alves on August 23, 2014 at UFC Fight Night 49.  However, Alves pulled out of the bout citing a knee injury and was replaced by Brandon Thatch.  Subsequently, Thatch also pulled out of the bout with Mein citing a toe injury. Mein would instead face Mike Pyle after Pyle's scheduled opponent at the event, Demian Maia, also pulled out with an injury. He won the fight via first round TKO. The win also earned Mein his first Performance of the Night bonus award.

The bout with Alves eventually took place on January 31, 2015 at UFC 183. Despite dominating the first round on the feet, Mein lost the fight via TKO in the second round after Alves landed a kick to the body.

In August 2015, Mein announced that he had retired from MMA competition. In September 2016 Mein was tested by the United States Anti-Doping Agency as part of the UFC anti-doping program suggesting a return to competition.

Returning from his nearly two-year sabbatical, Mein faced promotional newcomer Emil Weber Meek at UFC 206. He lost the fight via unanimous decision.

Mein faced Belal Muhammad on July 8, 2017 at UFC 213. He lost the fight by unanimous decision.

Mein faced Erick Silva on December 16, 2017 at UFC on Fox: Lawler vs. dos Anjos. He won the fight by unanimous decision.

As the last fight of his prevailing contract, Mein faced Alex Morono on July 28, 2018 at UFC on Fox 30. He won the fight by unanimous decision.

Bellator MMA 
On January 7, 2020 it was reported that Mein was signed with Bellator MMA. He made his promotional debut against Jason Jackson at Bellator 242 on July 24, 2020. Mein lost the bout via unanimous decision.

Championships and accomplishments
Ultimate Fighting Championship
Fight of the Night (One time)
Performance of the Night (One time)
MMAJunkie.com
2014 August Knockout of the Month vs. Mike Pyle

Mixed martial arts record

|-
|Loss
|align=center|31–13
|Jason Jackson
|Decision (unanimous)
|Bellator 242 
|
|align=center|3
|align=center|5:00
|Uncasville, Connecticut, United States
|
|- 
|Win
|align=center|31–12
|Alex Morono
|Decision (unanimous)
|UFC on Fox: Alvarez vs. Poirier 2 
|
|align=center|3
|align=center|5:00
|Calgary, Alberta, Canada
|
|- 
|Win
|align=center|30–12
|Erick Silva
|Decision (unanimous)
|UFC on Fox: Lawler vs. dos Anjos 
|
|align=center|3
|align=center|5:00
|Winnipeg, Manitoba, Canada
|
|-
|Loss
|align=center|29–12
|Belal Muhammad
|Decision (unanimous)
|UFC 213 
|
|align=center|3
|align=center|5:00
|Las Vegas, Nevada, United States
|
|-
|Loss
|align=center|29–11
|Emil Weber Meek
|Decision (unanimous)
|UFC 206
|
|align=center|3
|align=center|5:00
|Toronto, Ontario, Canada
|
|-
|Loss
|align=center|29–10
|Thiago Alves
|KO (body kick)
|UFC 183
|
|align=center|2
|align=center|0:39
|Las Vegas, Nevada, United States
|
|-
|Win
|align=center|29–9
|Mike Pyle
|TKO (punches)
|UFC Fight Night: Henderson vs. dos Anjos
|
|align=center|1
|align=center|1:12
|Tulsa, Oklahoma, United States
|
|-
|Win
|align=center|28–9
|Hernani Perpétuo
|Decision (split)
|UFC on Fox: Werdum vs. Browne
|
|align=center|3
|align=center|5:00
|Orlando, Florida, United States
|
|-
|Loss
|align=center|27–9
|Matt Brown
|TKO (elbows)
|UFC on Fox: Henderson vs. Melendez
|
|align=center|2
|align=center|1:00
|San Jose, California, United States
|
|-
|Win
|align=center|27–8
|Dan Miller
|TKO (punches)
|UFC 158
|
|align=center|1
|align=center|4:42 
|Montreal, Quebec, Canada
|
|-
| Win
|align=center|26–8
|Forrest Petz 
|TKO (knees and elbows)
|Score Fighting Series 7
|
|align=center|1
|align=center| 1:29
|Hamilton, Ontario, Canada
| 
|-
|Win
|align=center|25–8
|Tyler Stinson
|Decision (unanimous)
|Strikeforce: Rockhold vs. Kennedy
|
|align=center|3
|align=center|5:00
|Portland, Oregon, United States
| 
|-
|Loss
|align=center|24–8
|Tyron Woodley
|Decision (split)
|Strikeforce: Rockhold vs. Jardine 
|
|align=center|3
|align=center|5:00
|Las Vegas, Nevada, United States
| 
|-
|Win
|align=center|24–7
|Evangelista Santos
|TKO (elbows)
|Strikeforce: Barnett vs. Kharitonov 
|
|align=center|3
|align=center|3:18
|Cincinnati, Ohio, United States
| 
|-
|Win
|align=center|23–7
|Marius Žaromskis
|Decision (unanimous)
|Score Fighting Series 1
|
|align=center|3
|align=center|5:00
|Mississauga, Ontario, Canada
|
|-
|Win
|align=center|22–7
|Joshua Burkman
|Decision (unanimous)
|MMA: The Reckoning 
|
|align=center|3
|align=center|5:00
|Rama, Ontario, Canada
|
|-
|Win
|align=center|21–7
|Keto Allen
|Technical Submission (guillotine choke) 
|Rumble in the Cage 42  
|
|align=center|1
|align=center|0:42
|Lethbridge, Alberta, Canada
|
|-
|Win
|align=center|20–7
|Joe Riggs
|TKO (punches)
|Wreck MMA: Strong and Proud 
|
|align=center|2
|align=center|4:30
|Gatineau, Quebec, Canada
|
|-
|Win
|align=center|19–7
|Chase Degenhardt
|TKO (punches)
|Rumble in the Cage 41 
|
|align=center|1
|align=center|1:09
|Lethbridge, Alberta, Canada
|
|-
|Loss
|align=center|18–7
|Jason High
|Decision (unanimous)
|Rumble in the Cage 40  
|
|align=center|3
|align=center|5:00
|Taber, Alberta, Canada
|
|-
|Win
|align=center|18–6
|George Belanger
|TKO (punches)
|Pure Fighting Championships 5 
|
|align=center|1
|align=center|2:55
|Red Deer, Alberta, Canada
|
|-
|Win
|align=center|17–6
|Victor Bachmann
|Submission (neck crank)
|LGIO MMA 1: MacDonald vs. Horwich
|
|align=center|1
|align=center|4:21
|Edmonton, Alberta, Canada
|
|-
|Win
|align=center|16–6
|Andrew Buckland
|TKO (punches)
|Pure Fighting Championships 4 
|
|align=center|1
|align=center|N/A
|Red Deer, Alberta, Canada
|
|-
|Win
|align=center|15–6
|Tim Skidmore
|TKO (punches)
|Rumble in the Cage 38
|
|align=center|1
|align=center|0:42
|Calgary, Alberta, Canada
|
|-
|Loss
|align=center|14–6
|Mike Ricci
|Decision (unanimous)
|Ringside MMA: Rivalry
|
|align=center|3
|align=center|5:00
|Drummondville, Quebec, Canada
|
|-
|Win
|align=center|14–5
|Chad Freeman
|TKO (punches) 
|Rumble in the Cage 34  
|
|align=center|1
|align=center|2:20
|Lethbridge, Alberta, Canada
|
|-
|Win
|align=center|13–5
|Ryan Machan
|Submission (kimura)
|Pure Fighting Championships 2 
|
|align=center|2
|align=center|1:14
|Red Deer, Alberta, Canada
|
|-
|Win
|align=center|12–5
|Jeff Harrison
|TKO (punches)
|TKO 35: Quenneville vs. Hioki 
|
|align=center|1
|align=center|0:50
|Montreal, Quebec, Canada
|
|-
|Win
|align=center|11–5
|Justin Bermudez
|TKO (doctor stoppage)
|Vipers MMA: Venom at the Snakepit
|
|align=center|1
|align=center|0:42
|Calgary, Alberta, Canada
|
|-
|Win
|align=center|10–5
|Hollis Huggins
|KO (head kick and punches)
|Rumble in the Cage 30
|
|align=center|1
|align=center|0:20
|Lethbridge, Alberta, Canada
|
|-
|Loss
|align=center|9–5
|Samuel Guillet
|Submission (kimura)  
|TKO 32: Ultimatum 
|
|align=center|2
|align=center|4:05
|Montreal, Quebec, Canada
|
|-
|Win
|align=center|9–4
|Dave Pariseau
|Decision (unanimous)
|RITC 27: Seasons Beatings 
|
|align=center|3
|align=center|5:00
|Lethbridge, Alberta, Canada
|
|-
|Win
|align=center|8–4
|Kevin Manderson
|TKO (punches)
|UCW 10: X-Factor
|
|align=center|1
|align=center|N/A
|Winnipeg, Manitoba, Canada
|
|-
|Win
|align=center|7–4
|Chris Ade
|TKO (punches)
|EFC 5: Revolution 
|
|align=center|1
|align=center|1:25
|Prince George, British Columbia, Canada
|
|-
|Win
|align=center|6–4
|Adam Thomas
|Submission (rear-naked choke)
|Rumble in the Cage 26 
|
|align=center|1
|align=center|2:24
|Lethbridge, Alberta, Canada
|
|-
|Win
|align=center|5–4
|Garret Vernoy
|TKO (punches) 
|UCW 9: September to Remember  
|
|align=center|1
|align=center|N/A
|Winnipeg, Manitoba, Canada
|
|-
|Loss
|align=center|4–4
|Gavin Hesson
|TKO (punches)
|UCW 8: Natural Invasion 
|
|align=center|2
|align=center|3:59
|Winnipeg, Manitoba, Canada
|
|-
|Win
|align=center|4–3
|Lindsey Hawkes
|Decision (unanimous)
|Ultimate Martial Arts Championship 3
|
|align=center|3
|align=center|5:00
|Regina, Saskatchewan, Canada
|
|-
|Loss
|align=center|3–3
|Kevin Manderson
|Submission (rear-naked choke)
|RITC 21: Seasons Beatings 
|
|align=center|1
|align=center|4:14
|Lethbridge, Alberta, Canada
|
|-
|Win
|align=center|3–2
|Jason Geiger
|Submission (choke)
|UCW 6: Warzone 
|
|align=center|2
|align=center|N/A
|Winnipeg, Manitoba, Canada
|
|-
|Loss
|align=center|2–2
|Tim Jenson
|Submission (rear-naked choke)
|KOTC: Insurrection  
|
|align=center|N/A
|align=center|N/A
|Vernon, British Columbia, Canada
|
|-
|Win
|align=center|2–1
|Tom Wutpunne
|Submission (rear-naked choke) 
|Rumble in the Cage 18  
|
|align=center|1
|align=center|2:51
|Lethbridge, Alberta, Canada
|
|-
|Win
|align=center|1–1
|Josh Kretjo
|Submission (rear-naked choke)
|Ultimate Martial Arts Championship 2  
|
|align=center|1
|align=center|4:48
|Regina, Saskatchewan, Canada
|
|-
|Loss
|align=center|0–1
|Rory MacDonald
|Submission (rear-naked choke)
|Rumble in the Cage 17 
|
|align=center|1
|align=center|4:04
|Lethbridge, Alberta, Canada
|

See also
 List of male mixed martial artists
 List of Canadian UFC fighters

References

External links
 
 

1989 births
Canadian male mixed martial artists
Canadian practitioners of Brazilian jiu-jitsu
Canadian male kickboxers
Living people
Sportspeople from Lethbridge
Welterweight mixed martial artists
Ultimate Fighting Championship male fighters